The Discovery Tree also known as The Mammoth Tree was a giant sequoia tree located in Calaveras Grove, California. In the spring of 1852, A.J. Dowd stumbled upon a hidden grove in the Sierra Nevada, and with it, the existence of giant sequoias was revealed to the world. Among the magnificent trees he encountered stood the Discovery Tree, a towering 300-foot giant with a base measuring over 24 feet in diameter. But this natural wonder would soon become a symbol of humanity's destructive impact. The Discovery Tree was cut down and shipped to San Francisco and New York City for exhibition, its grandeur reduced to a mere spectacle for profit. Yet, its legacy lived on as a rallying cry for conservation efforts.  The tree's fate played a crucial role in the introduction of the Yosemite Grant to Congress, an act that helped preserve and protect these ancient giants for future generations. Today, the stump of the Discovery Tree remains a popular attraction in Calaveras Grove, which draws 200,000 visitors each year.

Discovery 
In the 1850s, reports of gold in California attracted a flood of immigrants to the state. Among the many stories circulating at the time was a tale of a grove of trees in the Sierra Nevada that dwarfed the tallest buildings on earth.
In May 1852, Augustus T. Dowd, a hunter working for a construction crew building canals to transport water to a mining camp, shot a large grizzly bear and followed it into a dense forest where he discovered the giant sequoias of the Sierra Nevada. Though Dowd's discovery was initially hailed as the first discovery of the big trees, historical evidence refutes his claim.

Felling and Exhibition 

In the 1850s, when travel to California's big trees was difficult and only possible by horse-and-wagon on primitive mountain trails, the idea of exploiting them for profit began to gain traction. One man, Mr. Lewis, a member of the discovery party that found the big trees, had the idea of removing the bark from one of the trees and transporting it to the East Coast for exhibition. In 1853, an article in the Daily Alta California noted that a section of bark had been taken off and packed for display at the Crystal Palace in New York.  However, Captain Hanford, a local resident, had his own scheme to fell the "Discovery Tree" for public exhibition. He bought the tree from his friend Lapham and proceeded to cut it down by drilling away at the trunk with two-inch pump augers and sawing at the spaces between the boreholes which took five men 22 days. The tree was over 25 feet in diameter, 280 feet tall, and 1,244 years old when felled.

The tree was eventually felled, and the bark was crated up and taken to San Francisco where it was put on display on Bush Street, adjacent to a local fair. The bark was reassembled in its natural state, forming the periphery of a spacious room, with a carpet, piano forte, and seats for forty persons. This attracted many visitors and was widely publicized in the San Francisco newspapers of the day.

In 1854, Hanford, with financial support from miners Kimball and Cutting, set out to bring the giant sequoia tree from California to the eastern United States. He arrived in New York City amid controversy surrounding the Crystal Palace, a popular exhibition space that had recently closed following the World's Fair. Hanford intended to showcase the tree at the Palace, but when he and the Palace's new president, P. T. Barnum, could not agree on terms, Hanford instead rented a space at 596 Broadway. However, just days before Hanford's exhibit was set to open, Barnum announced that he too would be displaying a giant California sequoia tree at the Crystal Palace. Hanford's exhibit opened one week later and was ultimately not as successful as Barnum's, due in part to the confusion caused by the competing exhibits.

Legacy 
The felling of the tree was met with widespread condemnation and dismay. Naturalist John Muir famously exclaimed, "Then the vandals danced upon the stump!" In 1864, the Discovery Tree served as a powerful symbol of the need for preservation and played a key role in the introduction of the Yosemite Grant to Congress. Even though the Calaveras land was owned by logging interests, public protests successfully halted the lumberjacks' saws.

In 1931, the land was finally purchased by the State of California.
The stump and remaining log of the Discovery Tree quickly became a popular tourist attraction. Since its discovery in 1852, Calaveras Big Trees has remained one of the state's longest-running and most beloved tourist destinations. The stump, which was used as a dance floor, a bar, and even a two-lane bowling alley, drew crowds of visitors eager to see the immense size of the tree and the other towering sequoias that make up the Calaveras Big Trees.

Dimensions

References

Bibliography
 Kruska, Dennis G. (1985). Sierra Nevada Big Trees: History of the Exhibitions, 1850-1903: Los Angeles, California: Dawson's Book Shop.
 Lowe, Gary D. (2004). The Big Tree Exhibits of 1870-1871 and the Roots of the Giant Sequoia Preservation Movement. Livermore, California: Lowebros Publishing.

Further reading 
 Stanford Libraries - Highlights from the Gary D. and Myrna R. Lowe collection on the Big Tree of California

Sequoia (genus)
Trees
Individual giant sequoia trees
1850s individual tree deaths
History of the Sierra Nevada (United States)
History of Calaveras County, California
Oldest trees